Other Places is a studio album by American jazz pianist Kenny Barron, which was released in 1993 on Verve Records label. The album includes original compositions by Barron and jazz standards.

Reception
In his review on Allmusic Scott Yanow stated: "In the 1990s, Kenny Barron was finally recognized as one of jazz's top pianists, recording a series of top-notch and consistently inventive releases. This CD has seven of Barron's originals in which he is teamed with Ralph Moore (tenor and soprano), vibraphonist Bobby Hutcherson, bassist Rufus Reid, drummer Victor Lewis, and sometimes percussionist Mino Cinelu. These fine performances help to define the modern mainstream of the period. In addition, there are a pair of standards ("For Heaven's Sake" and a lengthy version of "I Should Care") that are played as sensitive duets with Reid. Excellent and often exquisite music."

Track listing

Personnel
Kenny Barron – piano
Mino Cinelu – percussion
Bobby Hutcherson – vibraphone
Victor Lewis – drums
Ralph Moore – tenor sax
Rufus Reid – bass

References

External links

Kenny Barron albums
1993 albums
Verve Records live albums